Richard Tracey (born 9 July 1979) is an English former professional footballer. He is currently manager of Emley and a teacher at St Wilfrid’s Catholic High School & Sixth Form.

Playing career
Tracey started his professional career at Sheffield United in 1997. On 5 March 1998 he moved to Rotherham United, where he made one start and four substitute appearances before joining Carlisle United, initially on loan, on 12 March 1999. Tracey appeared in the famous Jimmy Glass game against Plymouth Argyle, in which the goalkeeper scored in the 94th minute to keep Carlisle United in The Football League. Tracey went on to make 54 starts and 15 sub appearances for the Cumbrians, scoring 15 goals.

Tracey joined Macclesfield Town in January 2001 and played for the club 37 times, scoring five goals. On 8 March 2002 after falling out of favour with then manager David Moss, Tracey signed for Scarborough but made only one appearance in which he suffered a bad injury for the "Seadogs" before leaving the professional game and moving into semi-professional football.

Tracey played for several other non-league clubs, including Bradford Park Avenue and Ossett Town, and Ossett Albion.

Managerial career
Tracey managed Ossett Albion between 2013 and 2018. He was appointed manager of Emley in May 2019.

Teaching career 
Tracey has been a PE teacher at St Wilfrid’s for many years. He is a Senior Leadership member and has been head of year for multiple different year groups. He is currently an Interim Assistant Headteacher and Director of Year 11.

References

1979 births
Living people
Emley A.F.C. managers
Association football forwards
Belper Town F.C. players
Bradford (Park Avenue) A.F.C. players
Carlisle United F.C. players
English Football League players
English football managers
English footballers
Footballers from Dewsbury
Frickley Athletic F.C. players
Gateshead F.C. players
Macclesfield Town F.C. players
Northern Premier League players
Ossett Albion A.F.C. managers
Ossett Albion A.F.C. players
Ossett Town F.C. players
Rotherham United F.C. players
Scarborough F.C. players
Sheffield United F.C. players
Stocksbridge Park Steels F.C. players